Takemi is a Japanese surname. Notable people with the surname include:

, Japanese politician
, Japanese researcher, educator, inventor and scientist

Takemi (written:  or ) is also a unisex Japanese given name. Notable people with the name include:

, Japanese swimmer
, Japanese baseball coach

Fictional Characters
Takemi, one of three members of Sailor Guardians: the Sailor Starlights in Sailor Moon Sailor Stars.
Takemi Aoba, a main character from manga Ultra B
Tae Takemi, a character from the video game Persona 5

Japanese unisex given names
Japanese-language surnames